Terhi Stegars (born 12 June 1974 in Kangasala, Finland) is a Finnish dressage rider. Representing Finland, she competed at the 2014 World Equestrian Games and at four European Dressage Championships (in 2011, 2015, 2017 and 2019).

Her current best championship result is 7th place in team dressage from the 2011 Europeans held in Rotterdam while her current best individual result is 20th place in special dressage at the 2015 Europeans in Aachen.

Stegars also competed at two editions of Dressage World Cup finals (in 2015 and 2016) where she finished 13th and 16th, respectively.

References

Living people
1974 births
Finnish female equestrians
Finnish dressage riders
Finnish expatriate sportspeople in Germany